Ismail bin Haji Bakar (Jawi: إسماعيل بن حاج بكر; born 19 January 1960) is the 14th Chief Secretary to the Government of Malaysia from 29 August 2018 until 1 January 2020.

Education background
Ismail holds a Bachelor of Economics (Hons) degree from University of Malaya and a Master of Business Administration degree and a doctorate from the University of Hull, United Kingdom.

Career 
Ismail joined the Administrative and Diplomatic Service as an Assistant Secretary at the Federal Treasury, Ministry of Finance on July 1983. He had served as the secretary-general of the Ministry of Agriculture and Agro-based Industry and the Ministry of Transport; budget director at the National Budget Office of the Ministry of Finance and senior advisor at the World Bank headquarters in Washington DC, United States.

Honours
  :
  Commander of the Order of the Defender of the Realm (PMN) - Tan Sri (2019)

 :
  Grand Commander of the Order of the Territorial Crown (SMW) - Datuk Seri (2017)

  :
  Companion Class II of the Exalted Order of Malacca (DPSM) - Datuk (2012)

  :
  Grand Knight of the Order of Sultan Ahmad Shah of Pahang (SSAP) - Dato' Sri (2015)

References

External links 
 Chief Secretary's website

1958 births
Living people
Chief Secretaries to the Government of Malaysia
University of Malaya alumni
Commanders of the Order of the Defender of the Realm